Skea is a small village and townland in County Fermanagh, Northern Ireland. It had a population of 114 people (along with Arney) in the 2001 Census. It lies within the Fermanagh and Omagh District Council area.

References 

 NI Neighbourhood Information System

Villages in County Fermanagh
Townlands of County Fermanagh